Breaking & Exiting is a 2018 American comedy-drama film written by Jordan Hinson, directed by Peter Facinelli and starring Milo Gibson and Jordan Hinson.

Cast
Milo Gibson as Harry
Jordan Hinson as Daisy
Adam Huber as Chris
James Kyson as Peter
Justine Wachsberger as Lana
Lily Anne Harrison as Cynthia
Cecile Cubilo as Anna
Hermann Ludovick Pattein as Michael
Blake Purdy as Melinda
John Hinson as Officer Brinkman
Colin Ferguson as Officer Davis
Joaquim de Almeida as Hank

Release
The film was released in limited theaters and on VOD on August 17, 2018.

Reception
The film has  rating on Rotten Tomatoes.  Adam Graham of The Detroit News graded the film a D+. The Hollywood Reporter gave the film a negative review and wrote that "it's as unconvincing as big-screen romances get, which is saying something." Dennis Harvey of Variety gave the film a negative review and wrote "...very little happens in the way of narrative or character development, which leaves the film over-reliant on a central chemistry that isn't really there." Frank Ochieng of Screen Anarchy gave the film a negative review and wrote "Breaking & Exiting should be more than a movie-going misdemeanor in this felonious flop devoted to a pair of lop-sided lonely hearts in transition."

References

External links
 
 

American comedy-drama films
2018 comedy-drama films
2010s English-language films
2010s American films